Andy Briggs (born 27 September 1972 in Liverpool, England) is a British author and screenwriter. He wrote the Hero.com series and the Villain.net young adult novels, which are due to be developed into a television series.

Briggs career began as an uncredited writer working on story development for Highlander: The Series in 1991. Since then he has worked alone and with brother Peter Briggs on a number of projects, including the Stan Lee and Robert Evans Paramount Pictures project Foreverman. More recent television work has included story development for the Sci-Fi Channel, BKN Kids and Disney XD.

In the mid-2000s he did some writing for comics, and began to develop his Hero.com/Villain.net series of young adult novels. This led to new series of young adult Tarzan novels.

Briggs has acknowledged Gordon Boshell's "Captain Cobwebb" books as an early influence.   He would often go to places to experience how it feels.

Credits
TV & film
 Passage of the Four (aka Screaming Night) (2002 film) writer
 Rise of the Gargoyles (2009 TV movie) writer
 Ghost Town (2009 TV movie) writer
 Dark Relic (2010 TV movie) writer
 Legendary: Tomb of the Dragon (2013) writer
 Legendary: The Shocate (upcoming) writer & executive producer
 Blake: Double Identity (upcoming TV series) head writer
 Crowhurst (feature film) writer

Comics
 Kong: King of Skull Island (2007–2008) 
 Ritual (2009) 

Books

 Tarzan:
 The Greystoke Legacy (June 2011) 
 The Jungle Warrior (July 2012) 
 The Savage Lands (February 2013) 
 Edge:
 Warrior Number One'' (November 2011)

References

External links
 
 Andy Briggs's Official Website
 Official Website

Living people
21st-century British novelists
British male screenwriters
1972 births
British male novelists
21st-century British male writers
21st-century British screenwriters